Two Soldiers is a 2003 American short drama film directed by Aaron Schneider with a score by Alan Silvestri. In 2004, it won an Oscar for Best Short Subject at the 76th Academy Awards. It is based on a 1942 short story by William Faulkner.

Cast
 Jonathan Furr - Willie Grier (as Jonathan 'Furrball' Furr)
 Ben Allison - Pete Grier
 Ron Perlman - Colonel McKellog
 David Andrews - Lieutenant Hogenbeck
 Mike Pniewski - Sheriff Foote
 Deacon Dawson - Mr. Grossnickel
 Joanne Pankow - Mrs. Habersham
 Danny Vinson - Pap Grier
 Suellen Yates- Maw Grier
 David Hall - Private
 D. H. Johnson - Colonel's Driver
 Al Wiggins - Man on the Bus
 Allan Hamilton - Bus Driver
 Warren Hendon - Old Man Killegrew (as Warren Jack Hendon)
 Nancy Saunders - Old Lady Killegrew
 Lorenzo Meachum - Blues Guitarist
 Lisa Boston - Woman on Street

References

External links

2003 films
2003 short films
2003 drama films
2003 independent films
American drama short films
American independent films
Films about brothers
Live Action Short Film Academy Award winners
Films based on short fiction
Films based on works by William Faulkner
Films directed by Aaron Schneider
Films scored by Alan Silvestri
2000s English-language films
2000s American films